Netball at the 1993 South Pacific Mini Games in Port Vila, Vanuatu was held from 7–12 December 1993.

Preliminary round

Pool A

Pool B

Consolation matches

7th/8th match

5th/6th match

Semi-finals

Third place match

Final

Final standings

See also
 Netball at the Pacific Mini Games

References

South Pacific Mini Games
Netball at the Pacific Games
1993 Pacific Games